Luis Carlos Martín Asensio (born 16 December 1990), known as Luis Carlos or Luisito, is a Spanish footballer who plays for Novelda CF as a left winger.

Club career
Born in Valladolid, Castile and León, Luis Carlos joined Real Valladolid's youth setup in 1998, aged eight. He was promoted to the reserves in 2009, but after making no appearances, was loaned to Atlético Tordesillas on 4 January 2010.

In June 2010, Luis Carlos rescinded his link and joined another reserve team, Hércules CF B. On 11 May of the following year he made his first team – and La Liga – debut, coming on as a second-half substitute for Sendoa in a 2–2 home draw against RCD Mallorca.

On 1 July 2011 Luis Carlos signed a two-year deal with Real Murcia, being assigned to the B-team in Tercera División. He subsequently resumed his career in the same division, representing FC Torrevieja, FC Jove Español San Vicente and Novelda CF.

References

External links

1990 births
Living people
Footballers from Valladolid
Spanish footballers
Association football wingers
La Liga players
Tercera División players
Real Valladolid Promesas players
Hércules CF B players
Hércules CF players
CD Torrevieja players